Tolib-khon Shakhidi (Толиб-хон Шахиди) or Tolib Shahidi (/, born 13 March 1946) is a Tajik and Soviet composer who was born in the city of Dushanbe, Tajik SSR. He is a son of the founder of Professional Tajik Academic Music – Ziyodullo Shakhidi.

Early life
Tolib-khon Shakhidi began his musical career at the age of fourteen. He graduated from the Musical College in Dushanbe in 1965 from the Composition Class of Uri Ter-Osipov.

Career
From 1972 to this day, Tolib Shakhidi has participated in a number of music festivals.

"Taste, intellect, professionalism are the three main values of contemporary music". This aphorism, expressed by the composer fully complies with his own creative work. Tolib Shahidi represents a very rare type of Universal master-composer, who possesses the whole arsenal of contemporary musical language, yet uses the richest resources of traditional Eastern music of his region.
This twin pillar is not an obstacle, but the most important source of his artistic power and originality.

He won the 2008 Georges Delerue Award for his score of the film Two-Legged Horse.

Personal life
Tolibkhon Shakhidi is married to Gulsifat Shakhidi.

List of major works
 1975 – Festival, symphonic poem
 1978 – Death of usurer, suite of ballet
 1978 – Tajiks, symphony No. 2
 1980 – Rubai of Khaiam, film ballet
 1981 – Charkh, symphony for chamber orchestra
 1981 – Sonata No. 1 for piano
 1981 – Recitative of Rumi, suite for flute and piano
 1984 – Sado, symphonic poem
 1988 – Caliph-stork, operas for children
 1989 – Karlic-nose, operas for children
 1989 – Beauty yosif, ballet
 1991 – Sonata No. 2 for piano
 1991 – Sonata No. 2 for piano and chamber orchestra
 1992 – Siavush, ballet
 1993 – Beauty and Monster, opera
 1993 – Concerto for violin and chamber orchestra
 1994 – Concert No. 3 for piano and orchestra
 1997 – Concert No. 1 for string orchestra
 1998 – Firdavsiada, concerto No. 2 for string orchestra
 1998 – Sufi-dancer, music for 15 instruments
 1998 – Istanbul-capricci, for saxophone and chamber orchestra.
 1999 – Dobro vam, vocal cycle for tenor and symphonic orchestra. Poems of Hofiz, Goethe, Pushkin
 1999 – Amir Ismoil, opera
 2000 – Silk road dreams dancing, septet
 2000 – Pictures under moon, for R. Finn poem, soprano and chamber orchestra
 2001 – Algorismus marimba+, sextet
 2001 – Contrasts in 55
 2001 – Contrasts, music for violin and piano
 2002 – King Lear, music for tragedy of Shakespeare
 2002 – Persian Suite, music for string orchestra
 2002 – Sufi and Buddha, pictures etude for piano
 2004 – Concerto Grosso No. 3, for santur, violino solo and chamber orchestra
 2005 – Contrast of times, vocal cycle for soprano and symphonic orchestra, words of Paul Valéry and Rekan
 2007 – Birds talking, suite for three flute
 2008 – Adagio, for violoncello solo in remembrance of Aram Khachaturian
 2008 – Allegro in 5, for chamber ensemble
 2008 – Four retro miniature for chorus A-Capella, in remembrance of Ziyodullo Shakhidi
 2008 – Playing Backgammon, for piano
 2009 – Verdi-Shakhidi, paraphrase for piano from opera Traviata
 2010 – Concerto for clarinet and orchestra
 2011 – Quartet for 4 cellos, from Indian Raga
 2012 – Darius, pictures for Symphonic Orchestra
 2012 – Adagio – Existence, for string orchestra
 2013 – Rhapsody Dialogue: Theme of Aram Khachaturian, for piano and orchestra

Discography
 Symphonic music (1997)
 Great Hall of Moscow State Conservatoire, Author Concert (1999)
 Symphonic Music (2004)
 Symphonic music and ballet extracts (2002)
 Movie Music & Existence – various music written for movies and theatre between 1969–2008 (2004)
 Concert featuring works of Tolibkhon Shakhdi, Live (2006)
 Gergiev-Shakhidi – Valery Gergiev, London Symphony Orchestra & Mariinsky Orchestra (2012)
 Anthology of piano music by Russian and Soviet composers, vol.7 – Melodija, (2014)

See also
Music of Tajikistan

References

External links
 Official website
 BBC Persian

1946 births
Living people
Tajikistani composers
Russian classical composers
Russian male classical composers
Soviet film score composers
Tajikistani film score composers
Georges Delerue Award winners
People from Dushanbe
Moscow Conservatory alumni
20th-century classical composers
21st-century classical composers
Male film score composers
20th-century Russian male musicians
21st-century Russian male musicians